Białęgi refers to the following places in Poland:

 Białęgi, Greater Poland Voivodeship
 Białęgi, West Pomeranian Voivodeship